Dicki Sörensen (born 8 November 1940) is a Swedish fencer. He competed in the individual and team épée events at the 1968 Summer Olympics.

References

External links
 

1940 births
Living people
Swedish male épée fencers
Olympic fencers of Sweden
Fencers at the 1968 Summer Olympics
Sportspeople from Uppsala
20th-century Swedish people